Mark David Damazer, CBE (born 15 April 1955), is a former Master of St Peter's College, Oxford, and a former controller of BBC Radio 4 and BBC Radio 4 Extra in the United Kingdom.

Early life and education
Damazer was born on 15 April 1955. He is the son of a Polish-Jewish delicatessen owner in Willesden in North London.  He is the younger brother of Benjamyn Damazer JP DL.

Damazer was educated at Haberdashers' Aske's Boys' School, an independent day school in the village of Elstree in Hertfordshire. He then studied history at Gonville and Caius College, Cambridge (from 1974), where he graduated with a double starred first in 1977. At Cambridge he had a relationship with Enoch Powell's daughter, Jenny.  Enoch Powell thanked him in his biography of Joseph Chamberlain.  After graduating, Damazer took up a Harkness Fellowship to study at the John F. Kennedy School of Government at Harvard University.

Career
Damazer returned to England to train at ITN in 1980, with fellow trainees Edward Stourton and Michael Crick. He joined the BBC World Service as a current affairs producer in 1981. From 1982 to 1984, he worked at TV-am, returning to BBC News in 1984. He joined Newsnight as an editor in January 1986. In August 1988, he became deputy editor of the Nine O'Clock News, becoming editor in 1990. In 1994, he became Editor of Television News Programmes, then Head of Current Affairs in May 1996. He became Head of Political Programmes in March 1998. He became Assistant Director of BBC News in December 1999, then Deputy Director in April 2001. He was appointed Controller of Radio 4 and BBC7 in October 2004, taking over from Helen Boaden. In 2006, he was involved in a controversy over his decision to replace the Radio 4 UK Theme with a "pacy news briefing, read by one of Radio 4's team of news readers". In 2008, he sacked Edward Stourton from the Today programme, and replaced him in 2009 with Justin Webb. Damazer is a Fellow of The Radio Academy.

On 12 April 2010, the BBC announced that Damazer was standing down as Controller of Radio 4 and leaving the Corporation to become Master of St Peter's College, Oxford. He took up the appointment of Master in October 2010.

In June 2020 he was announced as chair of the  Booker Prize Foundation, succeeding Baroness Helena Kennedy.

Philanthropy
Damazer served on the boards of trustees of the Institute of Contemporary British History and the Carl Rosa Opera. and Mental Health Media.

Damazer is the Senior Non-Executive Trustee of the Victoria and Albert Museum and a Trustee of the BBC since April 2015.

In 2013, Damazer was the captain of the winning team on Christmas University Challenge, representing Gonville & Caius College, Cambridge, who defeated Emmanuel College, Cambridge.

Personal life
Damazer met his wife Rosemary Morgan while at Harvard. They now live in south London with their two children.

Honours
In the 2011 New Year Honours, he was appointed Commander of the Order of the British Empire (CBE) for services to broadcasting.

References

External links
 
 

1955 births
Living people
Alumni of Gonville and Caius College, Cambridge
English Jews
British radio personalities
British people of Polish-Jewish descent
Harvard Kennedy School alumni
Masters of St Peter's College, Oxford
People educated at Haberdashers' Boys' School
BBC Radio 4
BBC executives
BBC Radio 4 controllers
British radio executives
Harkness Fellows
Commanders of the Order of the British Empire